Dušan Ristanović (born February 1933 in Čačak, Serbia) is a former Professor of Medical Biophysics at the Department of Biophysics of the Belgrade Medical School.

Biography
Prof. Dušan Ristanović is author of more than 400 scientific papers, with over 150 cited publications. He was also head of the Yugoslav Biophysical Association and Head of the Department of Biophysics, Medical School in Belgrade. His main scientific interests include biophysics, mathematical modeling of biological processes, neurophysiology, biostatistics, fractal analysis, and methodology of science.

He co-authored several of his publications in the 1970s and 1980s with among others his wife Dušanka Đokić-Ristanović, a theoretical physicist and physics professor at the University of Belgrade.

References

External links 
 Personal home page 
 List of publications

1933 births
Living people
Serbian biophysicists
Serbian physicists
Academic staff of the University of Belgrade
Yugoslav scientists